Oe is a village in Antsla Parish, Võru County in southeastern Estonia.

Writer Bernard Kangro (1910–1994) and painter Karl Pärsimägi (1902–1942) were born in Oe.

References

Villages in Võru County